Francis Edward Faragoh (born Ferenc Eduárd Faragó; October 16, 1898 – July 25, 1966) was a Hungarian-American screenwriter. He wrote for 20 films between 1929 and 1947. He was nominated for an Academy Award in 1931 for Best Writing, Adaptation for Little Caesar. He was born in Budapest, Hungary and died in Oakland, California from a heart attack.

Selected filmography
 Little Caesar (1931)
 Iron Man (1931)
 Frankenstein (1931)
 The Last Man (1932)
 Hat, Coat and Glove (1934)
 Becky Sharp (1935)
 Lady from Louisiana (1941)

References

External links

1898 births
1966 deaths
American male screenwriters
Hollywood blacklist
Writers from Budapest
20th-century American male writers
20th-century American screenwriters
Hungarian emigrants to the United States